Gregory Griffith is a Barbadian boxer. He competed in the men's welterweight event at the 1988 Summer Olympics.

References

External links
 

Year of birth missing (living people)
Living people
Barbadian male boxers
Olympic boxers of Barbados
Boxers at the 1988 Summer Olympics
Place of birth missing (living people)
Welterweight boxers